Bush Lake is the name of several lakes in the United States.

 Bush Lake (Hennepin County, Minnesota)
 Bush Lake (Wyoming)

See also 
Bushy Lake